Akgün may refer to:

Given name
 Akgün Kaçmaz (born 1935), Turkish footballer

Surnames
 Feride Akgün (born 1973), Turkish women's footballer
 Lale Akgün (born 1953), German politician
 Mehmet Akgün (born 1986), Turkish-German footballer
 Mensur Akgün, Turkish scholar
 Nurceren Akgün (born 1992), Turkish female handball player
 Ömer Akgün (born 1982), Turkish sport shooter
 Umutcan Akgün (born 2001), Turkish-Dutch entrepreneur

Places
 Akgün, Dinar, a village in the district of Dinar, Afyonkarahisar Province, Turkey

Turkish-language surnames